Klavdiya Ivanovna Shulzhenko (– June 17, 1984) was a Soviet popular female singer and actress.

Biography
Shulzhenko started singing with jazz and pop bands in the late 1920s. She rose to fame in the late 1930s with her version of Sebastián Iradier's La Paloma. In 1939, she was awarded at the first all-Soviet competition of pop singers.

During World War II, Shulzhenko performed about a thousand concerts for Soviet soldiers in besieged Leningrad and elsewhere. The lyrics of one of her prewar songs, "The Blue Headscarf", were adapted so as to suit wartime realities. Another iconic song of the Eastern Front (World War II), "Let's Have a Smoke", was later used by Vladimir Menshov in his Oscar-winning movie Moscow Does Not Believe in Tears.

In 1945, Shulzhenko was awarded the Order of the Red Star. She, as traditional pop singer, was named People's Artist of the USSR in 1971.

On April 10, 1976, Shulzhenko performed to enraptured audience in the House of the Unions in what would become her most famous concert.

References

External links
 Klavdiya Shulzhenko on YouTube

1906 births
1984 deaths
Musicians from Kharkiv
People from Kharkov Governorate
People's Artists of the USSR
Soviet people of World War II
Soviet actresses
Soviet pop singers
Soviet sopranos
Women in World War II
Burials at Novodevichy Cemetery